Odal von Alten-Nordheim (May 21, 1922 – July 28, 2004) was a German politician of the Christian Democratic Union (CDU) and former member of the German Bundestag.

Life 
Alten-Nordheim was a member of the CDU. He was a member of the municipal council of Wormsthal and the district council of the district of Schaumburg. In the 1969 federal election he was elected to the German Bundestag via the state list of the CDU Lower Saxony, to which he belonged until 1976.

Literature

References

1922 births
2004 deaths
Members of the Bundestag for Lower Saxony
Members of the Bundestag 1972–1976
Members of the Bundestag 1969–1972
Members of the Bundestag for the Christian Democratic Union of Germany